Chris Whitmire (born February 2, 1968) is an American politician who served in the North Carolina House of Representatives representing the 113th district (including constituents in Henderson, Polk, and Transylvania counties) from 2013 to 2017. A retired Lieutenant Colonel in the US Air Force, Whitmire also previously served on the Transylvania County Board of Education.

Electoral history

2014

2012

Committee assignments

2015-2016 Session
Agriculture
Appropriations
Appropriations - Education (Vice Chair)
Education - K-12
Homeland Security, Military, and Veterans Affairs, Chairman
Regulatory Reform
State Personnel

2013-2014 Session
Agriculture
Appropriations
Education
Homeland Security, Military, and Veterans Affairs
Commerce and Job Development
Public Utilities

References

1968 births
Living people
People from Transylvania County, North Carolina
United States Air Force Academy alumni
Columbia University alumni
Republican Party members of the North Carolina House of Representatives
21st-century American politicians